Qingyuan is a district of the city of Baoding, in the central part of Hebei province, China, covering part of the southern and eastern suburbs of Baoding.

Administrative divisions
There are 13 towns and 5 townships under the county's administration.

Towns:
Qingyuan, Ranzhuang, Yangcheng, Weicun, Wenren, Zhangdeng, Dazhuang, Zangcun,Baituan,  Shiqiao， Donglü, Heqiao,Wangting

Townships:
Beidian Township, Lizhuang Township, Beiwangli Township, Suncun Township, Yanzhuang Township

Notable people
 

Joseph Wei Jingyi (born 1958), a Chinese Catholic priest and bishop

See also
Donglü, Donglü Town, Qingyuan

References

External links
 

Geography of Baoding
County-level divisions of Hebei